This is a list of Dutch television related events from 1961.

Events

Debuts

Television shows

1950s
NOS Journaal (1956–present)
Pipo de Clown (1958-1980)

Ending this year

Births
4 August - Harm Edens, writer & TV presenter

Deaths